Circle of Deceit is a 1998 American thriller drama television film directed by Alan Metzger, written by Karen Clark, and starring Janine Turner, Esai Morales, Tracy Griffith and Joanna Cassidy. It aired on ABC on January 29, 1998.

Plot
Having walked out on her cheating husband Jeff, Terry Silva moves in with her best friend Donna Avedon. This set-up proves most untenable when Terry finds out that Donna is Jeff's longtime mistress. Vowing to get revenge on both Jeff and Donna, Terry fakes her own death — intending to frame her husband and her faithless friend for murder.

Cast
 Janine Turner as Terry Silva
 Esai Morales as Jeff Silva
 Tracy Griffith as Donna Avedon
 Robert Wisden as Coopersmith
 Dean Wray as Walker
 Joanna Cassidy as Elaine Greer

External links

1998 films
1998 drama films
1998 thriller films
1990s American films
1990s English-language films
1990s thriller drama films
ABC network original films
American drama television films
American films about revenge
American thriller drama films
American thriller television films
Films about adultery in the United States
Films directed by Alan Metzger
Films shot in Vancouver